Mijaín López Núñez (born 20 August 1982) is a Cuban Greco-Roman wrestler. He is a four-time Olympic gold medalist, five-time World Champion, and five-time Pan American Games champion and is widely considered one of the greatest wrestlers of all time. He is the younger brother of Michel López Núñez, a Cuban amateur boxer.

Career
López has represented Cuba at the 2004, 2008 and 2012 Summer Olympics in Athens, Beijing, and London, and was his country's flag bearer during the opening ceremonies in 2008 and 2012. In both competitions, he won the gold medal in the men's Greco-Roman 120 kg category. At the 2016 Rio Games, López won Gold in the 130 kg category. He again won gold at the 2020 Tokyo Games without losing a single point in the tournament becoming the first male wrestler to win four Olympic gold medals, as well as only the fifth athlete to win four gold medals in the same individual event.  During the opening ceremony of the same Olympics, he also became the first Cuban representative to become the country’s flag bearer four times, breaking the tie between Teófilo Stevenson and himself.

International competition record

|-
! style=background:white colspan=8 |International competition record (incomplete)
|-
!  Res.
!  Opponent
!  Method
!  Time/Score
!  Date
!  Event
!  Location
!  Venue
|-
|}

References

External links

 Mijaín López Núñez at the United World Wrestling Database
 

1982 births
Living people
People from Pinar del Río
Cuban male sport wrestlers
Olympic wrestlers of Cuba
Wrestlers at the 2004 Summer Olympics
Wrestlers at the 2008 Summer Olympics
Wrestlers at the 2012 Summer Olympics
Wrestlers at the 2016 Summer Olympics
Olympic gold medalists for Cuba
Olympic medalists in wrestling
Medalists at the 2012 Summer Olympics
Medalists at the 2008 Summer Olympics
Medalists at the 2016 Summer Olympics
World Wrestling Championships medalists
Wrestlers at the 2007 Pan American Games
Wrestlers at the 2011 Pan American Games
Wrestlers at the 2015 Pan American Games
Pan American Games gold medalists for Cuba
Pan American Games medalists in wrestling
Universiade medalists in wrestling
Central American and Caribbean Games gold medalists for Cuba
Competitors at the 2014 Central American and Caribbean Games
Competitors at the 2018 Central American and Caribbean Games
Universiade gold medalists for Cuba
Wrestlers at the 2019 Pan American Games
Central American and Caribbean Games medalists in wrestling
Medalists at the 2007 Pan American Games
Medalists at the 2011 Pan American Games
Medalists at the 2015 Pan American Games
Medalists at the 2019 Pan American Games
Wrestlers at the 2020 Summer Olympics
Medalists at the 2020 Summer Olympics
20th-century Cuban people
21st-century Cuban people